Field Marshal John Griffin Griffin, 4th Baron Howard de Walden, 1st Baron Braybrooke  (13 March 1719 – 25 May 1797), (born Whitwell), KB, of Audley End in Essex, was a British nobleman and soldier. He served as a junior officer with the Pragmatic Army in the Netherlands and Germany during the War of the Austrian Succession. After changing his surname to Griffin in 1749, he commanded a brigade of at least four battalions at the Battle of Corbach in July 1760 during the Seven Years' War. He also commanded a brigade at the Battle of Warburg and was wounded at the Battle of Kloster Kampen.

Origins
He was born John Griffin Whitwell, the son of William Whitwell by his wife Anne Griffin, sister and sole heiress of Edward Griffin, 3rd Baron Griffin of Braybrooke, and granddaughter of James Howard, 3rd Earl of Suffolk and 3rd Baron Howard de Walden (1619–1689).

Career
Whitwell was educated at Winchester College and commissioned as an ensign in the 3rd regiment of Foot Guards and lieutenant in the Army in 1739. He served with the Pragmatic Army in the Netherlands and Germany during the War of the Austrian Succession and was promoted to captain in his regiment and lieutenant colonel in the Army in March 1744.

Whitwell's aunt Elizabeth, Countess of Portsmouth agreed to leave him her interest in Audley End House if he changed his surname to Griffin: he did so in 1749, by Act of Parliament, becoming John Griffin Griffin. He became Member of Parliament for Andover in November 1749. Promoted to colonel on 29 May 1756 he became first major of his regiment on 9 May 1758. Promoted to major-general on 12 September 1759, he became colonel of the 50th Regiment of Foot in October 1759 and colonel of the 33rd Regiment of Foot in May 1760.

Griffin commanded a brigade of at least four battalions at the Battle of Corbach in July 1760 during the Seven Years' War. At Corbach, following the arrival of French reinforcements from Frankenberg, the allied army was forced to withdraw. He also commanded a brigade at the Battle of Warburg later that month where the allied army were more successful. He was present and wounded at the Battle of Kloster Kampen in October 1760.

Griffin was appointed Knight Companion of the Order of the Bath on 11 April 1761 and inherited Audley End House outright when his aunt died in 1762. Promoted to lieutenant-general on 26 March 1765, he became colonel of the 1st Troop, Horse Grenadier Guards in March 1766 and was promoted to full general on 14 April 1778. During the political crisis in the early 1780s at the end of the American Revolutionary War he was generally a supporter of William Pitt the Younger.

Pitt arranged for the Barony of Howard de Walden to be called out of abeyance in Griffin's favour, so elevating him to the House of Lords, on 3 August 1784 and for Griffin to be appointed Lord Lieutenant of Essex in November 1784. Griffin became colonel of the 4th Dragoons in March 1788, was additionally created 1st Baron Braybrooke on 30 August 1788 and was promoted to field marshal on 30 July 1796. He died at his home, Audley End House, on 25 May 1797 and was buried in the churchyard of St Mary the Virgin church at Saffron Walden.

Family

In 1749 he married Anna Maria Schutz and in 1765 he married Catherine Clayton; there were no children from either marriage.

References

Sources

|-

|-

1719 births
1797 deaths
People from Oundle
Members of the Parliament of Great Britain for English constituencies
British MPs 1747–1754
British MPs 1754–1761
British MPs 1761–1768
British MPs 1768–1774
British MPs 1774–1780
British MPs 1780–1784
04
01
British field marshals
British Life Guards officers
Knights Companion of the Order of the Bath
Lord-Lieutenants of Essex
Peers of Great Britain created by George III
British Army personnel of the War of the Austrian Succession
British Army personnel of the Seven Years' War